Van der Steen is a Dutch toponymic surname meaning "from the stone (house)". Variations on this name are Vandersteen, Van den Steen, Van Steen, Van de(n) Steene, Vandensteene. People with these surnames include:

 Van der Steen
Nicolaes van der Steen (1605–1670), Dutch theologian painted by Frans Hals
Franciscus van der Steen (1615–1672), Flemish engraver
Germain Van der Steen (1897–1985), French painter
Willem van der Steen (1905–1983), Dutch long-distance runner
 (1911–1996), Belgian long-distance runner
Mensje van der Steen (born 1946), Dutch writer using the pseudonym Mensje van Keulen
Niels van der Steen (born 1972), Dutch track cyclist
Jessica Van Der Steen (born 1984), Belgian fashion model
Wouter van der Steen (born 1990), Dutch footballer
Vandersteen
Willy Vandersteen (1913–1990), Belgian comics artist, prolific creator of comic books
Eline Vandersteen (born 1995), Belgian artistic gymnast
Van den Steen
Cornelis Cornelissen van den Steen (1567–1637), Flemish Jesuit and exegete
Eric J. van den Steen, Belgian-American economist
Kelly Van den Steen (born 1995), Belgian racing cyclist
Van den Steen de Jehay
 (1781–1846), Belgian provincial governor and diplomat
Werner van den Steen de Jehay (1854–1934), Belgian diplomat
Maria Van den Steen de Jehay (1870–1941), Belgian writer
Van Steen
Jean van Steen (1929–2013), Belgian footballer
Edla Van Steen (1936–2018), Brazilian journalist, actor and writer
Jac van Steen (born 1956), Dutch conductor
Gonda Van Steen (born 1964), Belgian-American classical scholar and linguist
Martin van Steen (born 1969), Dutch road cyclist
Jop van Steen (born 1984), Dutch footballer
 Vandesteene
Els Vandesteene (born 1987), Belgian volleyballer

See also
Steen (surname)
Steen (given name)

References

Dutch-language surnames
Surnames of Dutch origin